Heidi Vater (born 7 July 1966) is a German former footballer and manager who played as a defender, appearing for the East Germany women's national team in their first and only match on 9 May 1990.

Career statistics

International

References

External links
 
 Player profile at soccerdonna.de
 Manager profile at soccerdonna.de

1966 births
Living people
People from Apolda
Footballers from Thuringia
People from Bezirk Erfurt
German women's footballers
East German women's footballers
East Germany women's international footballers
Women's association football defenders
FF USV Jena players